Sprint Cup may refer to:

Sprint Cup Series, an auto racing series in the United States
Sprint Cup (trophy), the trophy awarded to the winner of the Sprint Cup Series driver's championship
Haydock Sprint Cup, a horse race in the United Kingdom
Sprint Cup (Hong Kong), a horse race in Hong Kong

See also
Sprint race (disambiguation)